Secrets of the Tribe is a 2010 Brazilian documentary film by director José Padilha.

Content 
This documentary explores the allegations, first brought to light in the book Darkness in El Dorado, written by Patrick Tierney, that anthropologists studying the Yanomami Indians in the 1960s and '70s engaged in bizarre and inappropriate interactions with the tribe, including sexual and medical violations. Scientists accused in this film are among others James Neel, Napoleon Chagnon, Kenneth Good and Jacques Lizot.

Release
Premiered at the 2010 Sundance Film Festival, the film was nominated for a Grand Jury Prize.

Afterwards 
Alice Dreger, an historian of medicine and science, and an outsider to the debate, concluded in a peer-reviewed publication that most of Tierney's claims (the movie is based on claims originally made by Tierney) were "baseless and sensationalistic charges".

A detailed investigation of these charges by a panel set up by the University of Michigan found the most serious charges to have no foundation and others to have been exaggerated. Almost all of the lengthy allegations made in Darkness in El Dorado were publicly rejected by the Provost's office of the University of Michigan in November 2000.

Sponsel and Turner, the two scientists who originally touted the book's claims, admitted that their charge against Neel "remains an inference in the present state of our knowledge: there is no 'smoking gun' in the form of a written text or recorded speech by Neel."

The American Anthropological Association has since rescinded its support of the book and acknowledged fraudulent and improper and unethical conduct by Tierney. The association admitted that "in the course of its investigation, in its publications, in the venues of its national meetings and its web site, [it] condoned a culture of accusation and allowed serious but unevaluated charges to be posted on its website and expressed in its newsletter and annual meetings" and that its "report has damaged the reputations of its targets, distracted public attention from the real sources of the Yanomami tragedy and misleadingly suggested that anthropologists are responsible for Yanomami suffering".

Stephen Broomer points out that, "Tierney wrote a polemical, unscientific book that invoked a scandal. Padilha's film is more evenhanded than this, no doubt because it includes that scandal as a subject, allowing Chagnon an opportunity to defend himself".

References

External links
 
 Secrets of the Tribe at Documentary Educational Resources

2010 films
2010 documentary films
Brazilian documentary films
British documentary films
Films directed by José Padilha
2010s Portuguese-language films
Anthropology documentary films
Documentary films about crime
Documentary films about indigenous rights
Indigenous cinema in Latin America
2010s English-language films
2010 multilingual films
Brazilian multilingual films
2010s British films